Cyrtonellida is a group of "monoplacophora", representing either a sister taxon to, or a polyphyletic assemblage including, the Trybliida.

Subtaxa 
 Carcassonnellidae
 Cyrtolitidae
 Cyrtonelloidea
 Pollicinidae

 Genera
 Aremellia
 Hamusella
 Tetamocornu
 Yangtzeconus
 Yochelsonia

References

External links 
 

Prehistoric monoplacophorans
Mollusc orders